The 1997 winners of the Torneo di Viareggio (in English, the Viareggio Tournament, officially the Viareggio Cup World Football Tournament Coppa Carnevale), the annual youth football tournament held in Viareggio, Tuscany, are listed below.

Format
The 32 teams are seeded in 8 groups. Each team from a group meets the others in a single tie. The winning club and runners-up from each group progress to the final knockout stage. All matches in the final rounds are single tie. The Round of 16 envisions penalties and no extra time, while the rest of the final round matches include 30 minutes extra time and penalties to be played if the draw between teams still holds. Semifinal losing teams play 3rd-place final with penalties after regular time. The winning sides play the final with extra time and repeat the match if the draw holds.

Participating teams
Italian teams

  Atalanta
  Bari
  Brescia
  Castel di Sangro
  Cosenza
  Cremonese
  Empoli
  Fiorentina
  Inter Milan
  Juventus
  Lecce
  Lucchese
  Milan
  Napoli
  Parma
  Perugia
  Roma
  Torino
  Udinese
  Viareggio
  Verona
  Vicenza

European teams

  Slavia Prague
  Manchester United
  Ajax
  Werder Bremen
  Borussia Dortmund
  Brøndby
  RCD Espanyol

American teams
  Pumas
Oceanian teams

  Marconi Stallions
  Goldfields

Group stage

Group 1

Group 2

Group 3

Group 4

Group 5

Group 6

Group 7

Group 8

Knockout stage

Champions

Footnotes

External links
 Official Site (Italian)
 Results on RSSSF.com

1997
1996–97 in Italian football
1996–97 in German football
1996–97 in Czech football
1996–97 in English football
1996–97 in Spanish football
1996–97 in Dutch football
1996–97 in Danish football
1996–97 in Mexican football
1997 in Australian soccer